Todd Benjamin is a former CNN presenter, anchor, correspondent and interviewer.  For 26 years, he worked for CNN as an anchor, correspondent and financial editor.  He has interviewed many people since 1993, including former Soviet President Mikhail Gorbachev, former US President Bill Clinton, and former Chairman of the Federal Reserve Alan Greenspan.  He now moderates conferences all over the world. 

He has been based in New York, Washington and Tokyo and now lives in London with his wife and child. For many years, he was a visiting lecturer in leadership at the London Business School Executive Education program. 

Benjamin is now deputy chairman and a trustee of City Harvest London, a charity that helps put fresh surplus food to good use in a sustainable way by redistributing to organizations that feed the hungry.

References 

American reporters and correspondents
Point Loma High School alumni
Living people
Year of birth missing (living people)